Juan Francisco Riveros Santos (born 16 May 1946) is a Paraguayan footballer. He played in four matches for the Paraguay national football team from 1966 to 1967. He was also part of Paraguay's squad for the 1967 South American Championship.

References

External links
 Juan Riveros at BDFutbol
 

1946 births
Living people
Paraguayan footballers
Paraguay international footballers
Association football forwards
Sportspeople from Asunción